B-cell CLL/lymphoma refers to a family of genes associated with certain types of lymphoma and leukemia.

Although named for B-cell chronic lymphocytic leukemia, they can be associated with other malignancies.

Members include: 
 CCND1 (also known as "BCL1")
 BCL2
 BCL3
 BCL5
 BCL6, BCL6B
 BCL7A, BCL7B, BCL7C
 BCL8
 BCL9
 BCL10
 BCL11A, BCL11B

See also 
 Bcl-2 family

References

Non-Hodgkin lymphoma